Accent (Акцент) is Belarusian heavy metal band.

Early years 
Accent was founded in 1986 by Michael Brusovanik, former guitarist of Belarusian hard rock band Отражение (en: Reflection), and Andrey Hmelnitsky.

Hiatus, reunion and the future
Victor Naumik and Gavrila reunited the band in 1997, released its third album in Mozyr, Belarus. In 2014 the band reunited to work on its fifth album.

Band members

2017- Now
 Evgeniy Tsilikov - guitar
 Andrey Medvedsky -drums
 Anton Kostyukov - vocal
 Alexander Binzhuk - bass
 Vladimir Gavrilenko() - keyboards

Discography
 1989:  Wind of Fortune  
 1997:  Accent  
 1987:  Rock Ballads()
 2015:  ASCENT

.

References

See also
ACCENT Official Site
Victor Smolsky
Anatoly Horbach
Michael Brusovanik

Belarusian heavy metal musical groups
Musical groups established in 1986
Musical groups disestablished in 2008
Musical quintets
1986 establishments in Belarus
Belarusian rock music groups
Soviet heavy metal musical groups